The Cabinet Secretary for Infrastructure, Investment and Cities was a position in the Scottish Government Cabinet. The Cabinet Secretary had responsibilities for infrastructure, procurement, transport, European Structural Funds, Scottish Water and cities. The Cabinet Secretary was assisted by the Minister for Transport and Islands.

History
The position was created in May 2011 as the Cabinet Secretary for Infrastructure and Capital Investment. The position was renamed as the Cabinet Secretary for Infrastructure, Capital Investment and Cities in September 2012 then as the Cabinet Secretary for Infrastructure, Investment and Cities in November 2014. The position was abolished in May 2016, with transport and infrastructure matters moving to the Cabinet Secretary for the Rural Economy and Connectivity.

Overview

Responsibilities
The responsibilities of the Cabinet Secretary for Infrastructure, Investment and Cities include:
 infrastructure and capital investment
 European structural funds
 government procurement
 water
 cities
 transport policy
 public transport
 air travel
 rail transport
 ferry services
 roads
 military veterans
 cross government co-ordination on Scotland's islands

Public bodies
The following public bodies report to the Cabinet Secretary for Infrastructure, Investment and Cities:
 Caledonian Maritime Assets
 David MacBrayne Ltd
 Glasgow Prestwick Airport
 Highlands and Islands Airports Ltd
 Scottish Futures Trust
 Scottish Water
 Transport Scotland
 Water Industry Commission for Scotland

List of office holders

References

External links
The Scottish Cabinet

Infrastructure and Capital Investment
Government procurement in the United Kingdom
Transport in Scotland
Infrastructure in the United Kingdom
Water in Scotland
Public finance of Scotland
2011 establishments in Scotland